Terezia Octavia Preda (born 18 June 1956) is a Romanian archer.

Olympics 

At the 1980 Summer Olympic Games she took part in the women's individual event and
finished 24th with 2195 points scored.

References

External links 
 Profile on worldarchery.org

1956 births
Living people
Romanian female archers
Olympic archers of Romania
Archers at the 1980 Summer Olympics